The 1783 New Jersey earthquake occurred on November 29 in the Province of New Jersey. With a magnitude estimated at 5.3, it stands as the most powerful earthquake to occur in the state.

Damage
Shaking was felt from New Hampshire to Pennsylvania. A brief foreshock occurred at 9:00 PM on November 29 (02:00 UTC on November 30) and an aftershock five hours later were reported only in New York City and in Philadelphia, Pennsylvania. The earthquake caused intensity VII damage on the Mercalli intensity scale. George Washington was sleeping at Fraunces Tavern when the earthquake struck, but he was not woken by the tremors.

References

1783 earthquakes
Earthquake
Earthquakes in the United States